Mark 'Marcos' Lugris (born January 1, 1962) is a former Puerto Rican football player. He played his professional club football mostly in the United States. Mark debuted for Puerto Rico  on June 17th 1983  in a Pan American Games Qualifier vs Surinam at Sixto Escobar Stadium in San Juan. He represented Puerto Rico in the 1990-94-98 FIFA World Cup Qualifying .Lugris was captain of the PRMSNT from 1992-1998 . Lugris also represented Puerto Rico in 4 Caribbean Shell Cups 93-94-95-98. In 1993 Shell Cup was the first and last time that Puerto Rico qualified for the group finals in Jamaica by winning its preliminary  group in Guyana. That year in May Puerto Rico attained its highest FIFA world ranking (93rd)in its history . 
The first qualification match of World Cup 94 USA was between Dominican Republic and Puerto Rico, played on 21 March 1992, and the Puerto Rican defender Marcos Lugris scored the first goal in qualification.In 1995 Lugris was inducted in the Fordham University Athletic Hall of Fame . In 1998 vs Haiti in Port au Prince, Lugris played his final match for the National team .In 2014,Lugris was  inducted in the Puerto Rican Soccer Hall of Fame . On April 5th 2018 Mark was announed as the Guest Honoree for the 5th Annual FutBoricua.Net Awards Gala in San Juan, Puerto Rico. At the Gala he was presented with the "Premio Cronica Joe Serralta" for his lifetime achievements with the Puerto Rican National team .In 2020, FutbolBoricua.Net announced its Historic Puerto Rico All Time  Best XI Team (El mejor XI en la historia de Puerto Rico) , Lugris was named to this team along with his teammates Roberto "Boy" Santana , Wilfredo " Cobre" Vinas and Chris Armas. On April 17th, 2022 the International Federation of Football History and Statistics, named Lugris to its "Mens All Time Puerto Rico Dream Team".

Career statistics

International

International goals
Scores and results list Puerto Rico's goal tally first.

References 
3.https://futbolboricua.co/premios-fbnet-2017-2018-seran-dedicados-a-mark-lugris/#

4.https://futbolboricua.co/el-mejor-xi-en-la-historia-de-puerto-rico/
 

1962 births
Living people
Fordham University alumni
Puerto Rican footballers
American soccer players
Puerto Rico international footballers
Association football midfielders
New York Cosmos players
Houston Dynamos players
Columbus Capitals players
Fort Wayne Flames players
Dallas Sidekicks (1984–2004) players
Dayton Dynamo players
Toronto Italia players
New York Kick players
Canton Invaders players
New York Pancyprian-Freedoms players
Carolina Vipers players
Canadian National Soccer League players
Puerto Rican expatriate footballers
Puerto Rican expatriate sportspeople in Canada
Expatriate soccer players in Canada